Statistics of Bahraini Premier League for the 2004–05 season.

Overview
It was contested by 10 teams, and Bahrain Riffa Club won the championship.

League standings

References
Bahrain - List of final tables (RSSSF)

Bahraini Premier League seasons
1
Bah